The golden mola hap (Mylochromis incola) is a species of cichlid endemic to Lake Malawi where it is found in shallow, vegetated waters.  This species can reach a length of  TL.  This species can also be found in the aquarium trade.

References

Golden mola hap
Fish of Africa
Fish described in 1935
Taxonomy articles created by Polbot